USS Ailanthus (AN-38/YN-57) was an  net laying ship which served with the U.S. Navy in the western Pacific Ocean theatre of operations during World War II. She was assigned to the U.S. Pacific Fleet with her protective anti-submarine nets. She ran aground at Lash bay, Tanaga Island in the Aleutians 26 February 1944 and was declared a total loss. She was only six months old.  Seabees of Naval Construction Battalion 45 assisted the ship's crew evacuate safely.

Built in Washington
Ailanthus (YN-57) was laid down on 17 November 1942 at Everett, Washington, by the Everett-Pacific Shipbuilding & Dry Dock Company; launched on 20 May 1943; sponsored by Miss Billie Jean McNatt; and placed in commission at Seattle, Washington, on 2 December 1943.

World War II service 

The net tender completed fitting out and, during the second half of December, conducted shakedown training. On the last day of 1943, she reported for duty in the 13th Naval District. On 20 January 1944, she was reclassified a net laying ship and redesignated AN-38.

Early in February, Ailanthus moved north to Pleasant Island, Alaska, where she arrived on 4 February. Reassigned that same day to Service Squadron 6, U.S. Pacific Fleet, she began to carry out net laying duties.

However, her career proved very brief. Having delivered a cargo of perforated steel plating (Marston Mat) to a Navy Seabee contingent building an airfield on the westernmost island of Attu, Ailanthus was caught in a violent winter storm, and on 26 February 1944, slipped her anchorage and was driven hard aground, suffering extensive damage. While still stranded, Ailanthus was reassigned to the newly constituted 17th Naval District (the Alaskan portion of the old 13th Naval District to which she had originally been assigned). Finally, she was declared a total loss, and her name was struck from the Navy List on 9 June 1944.

References 
 
 NavSource Online: Service Ship Photo Archive – YN-57 / AN-38 Ailanthus

 

Ailanthus-class net laying ships of the United States Navy
Ships built by Everett-Pacific Shipbuilding & Dry Dock Company
1943 ships
World War II net laying ships of the United States
Shipwrecks in the Bering Sea
World War II shipwrecks in the Pacific Ocean
Maritime incidents in February 1944